is a railway station on the Yonesaka Line in the village of Sekikawa, Niigata Prefecture, Japan, operated by East Japan Railway Company (JR East).

Lines
Echigo-Shimoseki Station is served by the Yonesaka Line, and is located 79.7 kilometers from the terminus of the line at Yonezawa Station.

Station layout
The station has two opposed ground-level side platforms connected to the station building by a footbridge.

Platforms

History
Echigo-Shimoseki Station opened on 10 August 1931. The station was absorbed into the JR East network upon the privatization of JNR on 1 April 1987.

Passenger statistics
In fiscal 2017, the station was used by an average of 90 passengers daily (boarding passengers only).

Surrounding area
 
Sekikawa village hall
Sekikawa Post Office

See also
 List of railway stations in Japan

References

External links

 JR East station information 

Railway stations in Niigata Prefecture
Yonesaka Line
Railway stations in Japan opened in 1931
Sekikawa, Niigata